The Claudian letters were developed by the Roman emperor Claudius (reigned 41–54). He introduced three new letters to the Latin alphabet:

Ↄ or ↃϹ/X (antisigma) to replace BS and PS, much as X stood in for CS and GS. The shape of this letter is disputed, however, since no inscription bearing it has been found. Franz Bücheler identified it with the variant Roman numeral Ↄ, but 20th century philologists, working from copies of Priscian's books, believe it to instead resemble two linked Cs (Ↄ+Ϲ), which was a preexisting variant of Greek sigma, and easily mistaken for X by later writers. This letter should not be confused with the "open O" letter Ɔ.
Ⅎ, a turned F or digamma (digamma inversum) to be used instead of the letter V when denoting the consonantal phoneme (/β). Thus, it resembles the use of the letter V in modern Latin texts, where the vocalic use of the letter V is represented by its variant U which has been recognized as a different letter only later.
Ⱶ, a half H. The value of this letter is unclear, but perhaps it represented the so-called sonus medius, a short vowel sound (likely // or //) used before labial consonants in Latin words such as optumus/optimus. The letter was later used as a variant of y in inscriptions for short Greek upsilon (as in Olympicus). It may have disappeared because the sonus medius itself disappeared from spoken language.

Usage
These letters were used to a small extent on public inscriptions dating from Claudius' reign, but their use was abandoned after his death. Their forms were probably chosen to ease the transition, as they could be made from templates for existing letters. He may have been inspired by his ancestor Appius Claudius the Censor, who made earlier changes to the Latin alphabet. Claudius did indeed introduce his letters during his own term as censor (47–48), using arguments preserved in the historian Tacitus' account of his reign, although the original proclamation is no longer extant. Suetonius said of Claudius' letters:

Support for the letters was added in version 5.0.0 of Unicode. Although these letters, as all Latin letters in antiquity, originally occurred only in capital form, lowercase forms have been introduced to meet Unicode casing requirements. The minuscule form for the turned F was designed as a turned small capital F and should not be confused with the IPA symbol  representing a voiced palatal stop.

The letters are encoded as follows:

See also
Chinese characters of Empress Wu

References

Palaeographic letters
Latin-script letters
Claudius
1st-century introductions
Latin epigraphy